is a 1981 Japanese film directed by Yasuo Furuhata.  The film was adapted from Shōtarō Ikenamis novel. Fujieda Baian is a doctor/assassin.

Cast 
 Kinnosuke Yorozuya as Fujieda Baian
 Katsuo Nakamura as Hikosan
 Takayuki Godai as Kosugi
 Akira Nakao as Abe
 Shinsuke Mikimoto as Tsuchiya Mondo
 Mayumi Ogawa as Osono
 Kimie Shingyoji as Osaki
 Junko Miyashita as Omon
 Juzo Itami as Omiya Sahei
 Susumu Fujita as Otowaya Hanemon

Awards and nominations
5th Japan Academy Prize
Won: Best Supporting Actor - Katsuo Nakamura
Nominated: Best Director - Yasuo Furuhata
6th Hochi Film Award
Won: Best Supporting Actor - Katsuo Nakamura

References

External links
 

1981 films
Films directed by Yasuo Furuhata
1980s Japanese films

ja:仕掛人・藤枝梅安#映画